Odda Nyhetsblad was a Norwegian newspaper, published in Odda in Hordaland county.

Odda Nyhetsblad was started in 1925 by Andreas Bjelland, who was the newspaper's only chief editor; he had formerly published the newspaper Sandheden from 1909 to 1910. Odda Nyhetsblad was closed in 1940, returned in 1945 but went defunct in 1946.

References

1925 establishments in Norway
1946 disestablishments in Norway
Defunct newspapers published in Norway
Mass media in Hordaland
Norwegian-language newspapers
Odda
Publications established in 1925
Publications disestablished in 1940
Newspapers established in 1945
Publications disestablished in 1946